Annona globiflora is a small fruiting plant in the family Annonaceae. It is native to Mexico.

Description

References

globiflora
Flora of Mexico